Martin Lawrence Live Talkin' Shit is the debut album by comedian Martin Lawrence.  The album was released in 1993 for East West Records.  Martin Lawrence Live Talkin' Shit was met with negative reviews but still managed to make it to No. 76 on the Billboard 200 and No. 10 on the Top R&B/Hip-Hop Albums charts.  Two singles were released, "Boxin'" and "White Kids/Black Kids", but neither made it to the Billboard charts.

Track listing
"Introduction" – 1:53
"Boxin'" – 6:31
"Eddie's House" – 2:49
"Worrying About Your Weight" – 5:35
"Michael Jackson" – 4:18
"Ilaldo" – 1:16
"White Kids/Black Kids" – 1:50
"Smokin' Weed" – 2:49
"Drivin' Cross Country" – 3:41
"I Love Sex" – 2:47
"Braggin On Their Dicks" – 5:53
"Talking During Sex" – 3:21
"Head" – 5:36
"Fartin' And Shitin'" – 3:25

Charts

Weekly charts

Year-end charts

References

1990s comedy albums
1993 debut albums
1993 live albums
East West Records live albums
Live comedy albums
Spoken word albums by American artists
Live spoken word albums
Martin Lawrence albums
Stand-up comedy albums